Orlow may refer to:

 Orlow language, a nearly extinct Australian Aboriginal language
 Orlow W. Chapman (1832–1890), American lawyer

See also

 Orłów (disambiguation)